Raquel Teresa Correa (8 July 1934 – 10 September 2012) was a Chilean journalist who spent the main part of her career with the newspaper El Mercurio. She was well known for her interviews and reporting, and was the recipient of Chile's National Prize for Journalism in 1991.

References

1934 births
2012 deaths
Chilean women journalists
Chilean people of Catalan descent
20th-century Chilean women writers
20th-century Chilean non-fiction writers
21st-century Chilean women writers
21st-century Chilean non-fiction writers